Dmitri Khlebosolov (born 7 October 1990) is a Belarusian former professional footballer.

He is a son of Belarusian coach and former international footballer Andrey Khlebasolaw.

Career

Club
In January 2018, Khlebosolov went on trial with Tajik League Champions Istiklol.

Honours
Naftan Novopolotsk
Belarusian Cup: 2011–12

References

External links
 Spartak Moscow Profile
 
 
 
 

1990 births
Living people
Belarusian footballers
Association football forwards
Belarusian expatriate footballers
Expatriate footballers in Russia
Expatriate footballers in Germany
Expatriate footballers in Poland
Expatriate footballers in the Maldives
2. Bundesliga players
FC Baranovichi players
FC Spartak Moscow players
FC Naftan Novopolotsk players
FC Torpedo-BelAZ Zhodino players
Dynamo Dresden players
FC Gomel players
FC Belshina Bobruisk players
FC Granit Mikashevichi players
FC Vitebsk players
FC Neman Grodno players
FC Slavia Mozyr players
United Victory players
Sportspeople from Brest, Belarus